Domain-driven design (DDD) is a major software design approach, focusing on modeling software to match a domain according to input from that domain's experts.

Under domain-driven design, the structure and language of software code (class names, class methods, class variables) should match the business domain. For example, if software processes loan applications, it might have classes like loan application, customer, and methods such as accept offer and withdraw.

Domain-driven design is predicated on the following goals:

 placing the project's primary focus on the core domain and domain logic;
 basing complex designs on a model of the domain;
 initiating a creative collaboration between technical and domain experts to iteratively refine a conceptual model that addresses particular domain problems.
Criticisms of domain-driven design argue that developers must typically implement a great deal of isolation and encapsulation to maintain the model as a pure and helpful construct. While domain-driven design provides benefits such as maintainability, Microsoft recommends it only for complex domains where the model provides clear benefits in formulating a common understanding of the domain.

The term was coined by Eric Evans in his book of the same title published in 2003.

Overview
Domain-driven design articulates a number of high-level concepts and practices. 

Of primary importance is a domain, the subject area to which the user applies a program is the domain of the software. A software's domain governs its context, the setting in which a word or statement appears that determines its meaning. From this, developers build a domain model: a system of abstractions that describes selected aspects of a domain and can be used to solve problems related to that domain.

These aspects of domain-driven design aim to foster a common language shared by domain experts, users, and developers—the ubiquitous language. The ubiquitous language is used in the domain model and for describing system requirements.

Ubiquitous language is one of the pillars of DDD together with strategic design and tactical design.

In domain-driven design, the domain layer is one of the common layers in an object-oriented multilayered architecture.

Kinds of models 
Domain-driven design recognizes multiple kinds of models.

For example, an entity is an object defined not by its attributes, but its identity. As an example, most airlines assign a unique number to seats on every flight: this is the seat's identity.

In contrast, a value object is an immutable object that contains attributes but has no conceptual identity. When people exchange business cards, for instance, they only care about the information on the card (its attributes) rather than trying to distinguish between each unique card.

Models can also define events (something that happened in the past). A domain event is an event that domain experts care about.

Models can be bound together by a root entity to become an aggregate. Objects outside the aggregate are allowed to hold references to the root but not to any other object of the aggregate. The aggregate root checks the consistency of changes in the aggregate. Drivers do not have to individually control each wheel of a car, for instance: they simply drive the car. In this context, a car is an aggregate of several other objects (the engine, the brakes, the headlights, etc.).

Working with models 
In domain-driven design, an object's creation is often separated from the object itself.

A repository, for instance, is an object with methods for retrieving domain objects from a data store (e.g. a database). Similarly, a factory is an object with methods for directly creating domain objects.

When part of a program's functionality does not conceptually belong to any object, it is typically expressed as a service.

Relationship to other ideas
Although domain-driven design is not inherently tied to object-oriented approaches, in practice, it exploits the advantages of such techniques. These include entities/aggregate roots as receivers of commands/method invocations, the encapsulation of state within foremost aggregate roots, and on a higher architectural level, bounded contexts.

As a result, domain-driven design is often associated with Plain Old Java Objects and Plain Old CLR Objects. While technically technical implementation details, specific to Java and the .NET Framework respectively, these terms reflect a growing view that domain objects should be defined purely by the business behavior of the domain, rather than by a more specific technology framework.

Similarly, the naked objects pattern holds that the user interface can simply be a reflection of a good enough domain model. Requiring the user interface to be a direct reflection of the domain model will force the design of a better domain model.

Domain-driven design has influenced other approaches to software development.

Domain-specific modeling, for instance, is domain-driven design applied with domain-specific languages. Domain-driven design does not specifically require the use of a domain-specific language, though it could be used to help define a domain-specific language and support domain-specific multimodeling.

In turn, aspect-oriented programming makes it easy to factor out technical concerns (such as security, transaction management, logging) from a domain model, letting them focus purely on the business logic.

Model-driven engineering and architecture 
While domain-driven design is compatible with model-driven engineering and model-driven architecture, the intent behind the two concepts is different. Model-driven architecture is more concerned with translating a model into code for different technology platforms than defining better domain models. 

However, the techniques provided by model-driven engineering (to model domains, to create domain-specific languages to facilitate the communication between domain experts and developers,...) facilitate domain-driven design in practice and help practitioners get more out of their models. Thanks to model-driven engineering's model transformation and code generation techniques, the domain model can be used to generate the actual software system that will manage it.

Command Query Responsibility Segregation 
Command Query Responsibility Segregation (CQRS) is an architectural pattern for separating reading data (a 'query') from writing to data (a 'command'). CQRS derives from Command and Query Separation (CQS), coined by Bertrand Meyer.

Commands mutate state and are approximately equivalent to method invocation on aggregate roots or entities. Queries read state but do not mutate it. 

While CQRS does not require domain-driven design, it makes the distinction between commands and queries explicit with the concept of an aggregate root. The idea is that a given aggregate root has a method that corresponds to a command and a command handler invokes the method on the aggregate root.

The aggregate root is responsible for performing the logic of the operation and yielding either a number of events, a failure response or just mutating its own state that can be written to a data store. The command handler pulls in infrastructure concerns related to saving the aggregate root's state and creating needed contexts (e.g., transactions).

Event sourcing 
Event sourcing is an architectural pattern in which entities do not track their internal state by means of direct serialization or object-relational mapping, but by reading and committing events to an event store. 

When event sourcing is combined with CQRS and domain-driven design, aggregate roots are responsible for validating and applying commands (often by having their instance methods invoked from a Command Handler), and then publishing events. This is also the foundation upon which the aggregate roots base their logic for dealing with method invocations. Hence, the input is a command and the output is one or many events which are saved to an event store, and then often published on a message broker for those interested (such as an application's view).

Modeling aggregate roots to output events can isolate internal state even further than when projecting read-data from entities, as in standard n-tier data-passing architectures. One significant benefit is that axiomatic theorem provers (e.g. Microsoft Contracts and CHESS) are easier to apply, as the aggregate root comprehensively hides its internal state. Events are often persisted based on the version of the aggregate root instance, which yields a domain model that synchronizes in distributed systems through optimistic concurrency.

Notable tools
Although domain-driven design does not depend on any particular tool or framework, notable examples include:
 Actifsource, a plug-in for Eclipse which enables software development combining DDD with model-driven engineering and code generation.
 CubicWeb, an open source semantic web framework entirely driven by a data model. High-level directives allow to refine the data model iteratively, release after release. Defining the data model is enough to get a functioning web application. Further work is required to define how the data is displayed when the default views are not sufficient.
OpenMDX, an open-source, Java-based, MDA Framework supporting Java SE, Java EE, and .NET. OpenMDX differs from typical MDA frameworks in that "use models to directly drive the runtime behavior of operational systems".
 Restful Objects, a standard for mapping a Restful API onto a domain object model (where the domain objects may represent entities, view models, or services). Two open source frameworks (one for Java, one for .NET) can create a Restful Objects API from a domain model automatically, using reflection.

See also
 Data mesh, a domain-oriented data architecture
 Event storming
 Knowledge representation
 Ontology (information science)
 Semantic analysis (knowledge representation)
 Semantic networks
 Semantics

References

External links
 
 Implementing Aggregate root in C# language
 

Software architecture
Software design
Software development philosophies